Simone Legno (born June 16, 1977) is an Italian artist best known for the creation of the tokidoki brand.  Legno's designs are influenced by his interest in Japan and its culture, as well as street art and graffiti.

Early life
After dropping out of college, where he studied political science, Legno studied at the European Institute of Design in Rome. Legno built tokidoki as a personal website, not a company website, around 2001.

While in school, he wanted his own website and was a fan of Japanese art and culture. He would go to Japanese cultural institutes and all of his art works were inspired by books from Lonely Planet, prints, Japanese art books and posters, everything was about Japan.  So he wanted a Japanese word and decided upon the word "tokidoki", which means "sometimes". "tokidoki is the hope, the hidden energy that everyone has inside. It gives us the strength to face a new day and dream about something positive and the hope that something magical will happen to us".

Tokidoki is "[a] mixture of "visual inputs, cultures and perfect blending of opposites living together".

Career
Legno's career started when he was still in school in Italy, where he created a website as a visual diary and platform to showcase his portfolio of works.  With this website he created various illustrations, advertisements, designs, and other freelance media for clients.  He was then discovered and presented a partnership by Pooneh Mohajer and her husband Ivan Arnold — co-founders of the American cosmetics brand Hard Candy. In 2004, Simone Legno moved to Los Angeles to develop his tokidoki merchandise and art, where he launched his artistic career with the help of his 2 business partners (Ivan Arnold and Pooneh Mohajer Arnold).  Simone Legno has definitely surprised the contemporary world with an art collection which is "cute, playful and pure, yet provocative, [and] sophisticated."

Legno's portfolio website was listed as one of the top ten websites of the week by The Independent in 2003. This caught the attention of Hard Candy co-founder Pooneh Mohajer and her husband Ivan Arnold. The two contacted him and after meeting, they formed the tokidoki business venture.

In June 2009 it was announced that Legno would release a line of young punk rock inspired characters that would sell at the US-based retailer Target.

Legno's work includes characters such as the "Moofia", "Cocomando", "Wild Boys", "'Til Death Do Us Part", and "Cactus Friends", which include personified cows, tigers, and monkeys, or Japanese inspired characters in bright outfits.  Legno also creates acrylic on canvas works featuring "more modern, fashionable versions of the women found on classic Japanese woodblock prints".

Since relocating from Rome to Los Angeles, Legno's art has become prominent in the pop culture scene. As stated by Legno: "Tokidoki is a happy world... that I imagine, live and dream of".

Gallery representation
Hong Kong, K11 Art Mall.
Vinyl Toys, art-skateboards, pin badges, jewelry, watches, knitwear, sportswear, accessories, shoes, stationery and more to come.
tokidoki distributes its products to Nordstrom, Macy's, Fred Segal, Karmaloop and approximately 1000 boutiques in more than 60 countries worldwide.

Past projects
ProjectFOX

References

Italian artists
1977 births
Living people
Italian graphic designers